Julien Cuaz (born 17 March 1977) is a French former professional tennis player.

A native of Lyon, Cuaz had a best singles world ranking of 465 and played in the qualifying draw at the 1996 French Open. His only ATP Tour main draw appearances was in the doubles at Marseille in 2001 and he made two doubles finals on the ATP Challenger Tour.

Cuaz was one of the coaches of Australian Open boys' singles champion Clément Morel.

ITF Futures titles

Singles: (1)

Doubles: (8)

References

External links
 
 

1977 births
Living people
French male tennis players
Tennis players from Lyon